Waddan is an oasis town of the Sahara Desert in the northeast Fezzan region of southwest Libya. It is in the Jufra District.

Geography
The town is at the crossroads of the Sirte-Waddan Road and the Fezzan Road.

The natural springs support native date palm (Phoenix dactylifera) groves.

History

During the Libyan Civil War, NATO forces bombed an ammunition store in the town. On 8 September 2011, the town was reported to be under the control of forces allied with the National Transitional Council.

References

See also 
 List of cities in Libya

Populated places in Jufra District
Oases of Libya